The Supermarine S.4 was a 1920s British single-engined monoplane built by Supermarine. Designed by a team led by the company's chief designer, R. J. Mitchell, it was built to race in the 1925 Schneider Trophy contest.

Mitchell's design was revolutionary. Aware of the need to reduce drag forces to increase speed, he produced a floatplane that was in marked contrast to the flying boats he had designed.

At Bay Shore Park in Baltimore in the US, the venue of the 1925 contest, the S.4's rear end was damaged by a falling pole during a gale prior to the event.

Mitchell used the practical experience gained from his work on the S.4 when he designed its immediate successor, the Supermarine S.5.

Design and development
During 1925, Supermarine's chief designer, R. J. Mitchell, was working on a new aircraft to compete in that year's Schneider Trophy race. The decision to begin the design process was made jointly by Napier and Supermarine on 18 March 1925. Following the success of the Americans during the previous contest, Mitchell was fully aware of the need to reduce drag forces to increase speed. His new design was for a mid-wing, cantilever floatplane. It was comparable to a French monoplane, the Bernard SIMB V.2, which had broken the flight airspeed record in December 1924. The new design was in marked contrast to the flying boats which Mitchell had designed for previous Schneider Trophy races, which had won in 1922 and come third behind the American Curtiss CR seaplanes in 1923.

The name S.4 was designated by Mitchell, with "S" standing for Schneider. He saw the three previous Schneider Trophy entrants (the Supermarine Sea Lion series) as S.1, S.2, and S.3. The S.4 was the first Schneider Trophy entrant to be supported by the British government, who agreed to buy the aircraft if Supermarine and Napier covered the initial costs of development and construction. The Air Ministry provided the British teams with greater freedom than was given by the US government to their designers.

The S.4 was a monoplane seaplane with an unbraced cantilever wing and semi-monocoque fuselage, powered by a specially developed version of the Napier Lion, a water-cooled engine developed to produce  over a short racing period. The aircraft was primarily constructed from wood: the single-piece unbraced wing had two spars with spruce flanges and plywood webs, and was covered with plywood braced by stringers. The fuselage had a covering of diagonally-laid spruce planking over plywood formers constructed around a pair of steel A-frames, to which the engine bearers and wing spars were attached and which carried the floats. The single-step floats were metal. The S.4 lacked the newly-designed surface radiators, at that time still unavailable, but it was aerodynamic and aesthetically pleasing. The radiators, which were mounted under the wings, were the only part of the machine to extend from the fuselage.

In September 1925, Flight reported:

Operational history

Allocated the civil registration G-EBLP and the Air Ministry serial number N197, the S.4 first flew on 24 August 1925, witnessed by Mitchell, who went out in a motorboat with Lord Mountbatten. Testing took place at Calshot, because of the long take-off runs that were required.

Supermarine's chief test pilot Henri Biard was reportedly unhappy with the S.4, disliking the unbraced wings, and the cockpit position, which was well back behind the wings. The location of the cockpit was potentially hazardous, as it restricted the pilot's view ahead, particularly during take-off and landing. On its maiden flight, the S.4 came close to colliding with an ocean liner because of this.

Schneider Trophy competition of 1925

With high hopes of a British victory in the forthcoming Schneider Trophy competition at Bay Shore Park, Baltimore, the S.4, together with two Gloster III biplanes, was shipped to the US aboard the SS Minnewaska, free of charge. During the voyage, Supermarine's pilot Biard slipped playing tennis, and injured his wrist.

Bad weather meant that those Schneider Trophy competitors that had already arrived for the competition had little opportunity to practise the course. The aircraft were forced to remain in their crates whilst canvas hangars were being erected on the beach to accommodate them. During this period, Biard caught influenza, but recovered in time to take part in the competition. The windy conditions had however blown down the hangar where the S.4 was being kept, and the rear end of the aircraft had been damaged by a falling pole. The S.4 was repaired in time to take part in the navigation trials on 23 October 1925.

During the navigation trials, the S.4 initially performed well, but upon its return to shore, the control column began to oscillate violently and Biard lost control of the machine at high speed. Biard, who initially had lost consciousness when he was still strapped into the aeroplane, was able to resurface from the sea bed, and cling on to some floating wreckage. The first launch sent out to him broke down with engine trouble, and he had to be rescued by a second launch. Mitchell, who was on board the launch, jokingly asked the injured man: "Is the water warm?" Biard was later found to have broken two ribs.

Parts of the aircraft, which was wrecked as a result of the crash, were salvaged. Most sources have suggested the accident was due to flutter, but although an enquiry was later held, the reasons for the crash were never clearly established.

Aftermath of the crash
The race was won two days later by Lieutenant James Doolittle, flying a Curtiss R3C at an average speed of 232.573 mph (374.443 km/h), which was faster than the S.4's world record of a month before. It was evident to the other national teams that the American approach towards the contest, which involved training for the pilots and development testing of the aircraft—was required. Mitchell was to say as much when he gave a lecture to the Royal Aeronautical Society in 1927. From 1925 onwards, the Air Ministry developed a policy of producing high speed aircraft and using wind tunnel tests to analyse their performance.

Legacy 

The Supermarine S.4 was a revolutionary aircraft that was years ahead of its time, and which "set the pattern in specific aircraft design that persisted through the [1930s and 1940s]". The winning aircraft of the 1926 Schneider contest, the Italian Macchi M.39, bore distinct similarities with the S.4. Mitchell used the practical experience gained when he designed its successor, the Supermarine S.5. The S.4 has been described as "his first outstanding success".

The S.5 was made to be more stable in the air. It had a smaller fuselage cross section, and more streamlined floats, modifications which provided it with estimated increases in speed over its predecessor. The greatest speed increase——was produced by the introduction of surface radiators to cool the engine, as they notably reduced the drag forces acting on the aircraft. Tests made on a model of the S.4 at the National Physics Laboratory which were done after the crash revealed that the Lamblin radiators accounted for a third of the aircraft's drag, and that without them the S.4 would have been the "cleanest" monoplane in the world.

Drawings and archival footage of the plane's construction, and five minutes of film that show the aircraft's first takeoff and flight are preserved in Leslie Howard's biographical film about Mitchell, The First of the Few (1942).

Specifications

See also

Notes

References

Sources

External links

 Will England Win it? and Britain's Fine Bid for Schneider Cup (film footage of the S.4 at Calshot, from British Pathé)
 Schneider Trophy Races, a history from Bluebird

Schneider Trophy
1920s British sport aircraft
S.4
Aircraft first flown in 1925
Single-engined tractor aircraft
Aviation accidents and incidents caused by loss of control
Floatplanes